Australia has played Test rugby since 1899. Test captains are listed chronologically from the first time they captained Australia in a Test match. Matches are exclusively those that have been granted Test status by the Australian Rugby Union regardless of whether the opposing team's governing body awarded the match Test status or not.

Captains 

Notes

See also 
 List of Australia national rugby union team records
 List of Australia national rugby union team test match results

Citations

References  

 

    
Captains